Sepideh (born 14 January 1975) is an Iranian-born singer.  She has recorded and toured around the world multiple times, performing songs in multiple languages including Persian, English, Armenian, Arabic, and Turkish.

Personal life
Sepideh was born in Tehran, Iran and is of Kurdish descent on her father's side.  She moved with her family to the Washington D.C. area in the late 1980s. She started singing in a band called Setareh while still in high school. After graduating, she joined another band called Mask. The band did shows all along the east coast of the United States for several years before Sepideh moved to Los Angeles, California in 1997 to pursue a career in music full time. She still lives in Los Angeles area with her husband.

Career
After moving to Los Angeles in 1997, Sepideh got her break upon meeting the Persian music industry producer Shahbal Shabpareh.  Sepideh started working with Shahbal in 1998 when he asked her to join as lead singer of the all-female Persian singing group Silhouettt (aka Silhouettte). Soon after, in 1999, the album "Beauty and the Beat" was released with Sepideh having recorded all vocals for the album. Silhouettt opened that year for Shahbal's band Black Cats, performing concerts around the world in support of the album. A few years later, in 2004, Sepideh released her first solo album entitled "Girl in the Mirror" with music producer Ramin Zamani. She followed that album in 2007 with her second solo album "No Fear," produced by Schubert Avakian. The book Soundtrack of the Revolution mentions that Sepideh is a "Shakira-esque pop singer". Although she has released no full albums since 2007, Sepideh has released multiple singles since then.

After the death of the Persian female music icon Mahasti in 2007, Sepideh was one of only four Persian female singers asked by the Tapesh TV Network to record and perform a tribute song in Mahasti's memory. The other singers involved in the project were Leila Forouhar, Helen, and Hengameh.

In 2016, Sepideh gave a live performance as the musical guest star for the finale of the Manoto TV talent show Stage.

Sepideh has developed a large online social media presence where she has accumulated millions of followers on various platforms like Facebook, Instagram, Twitter, and Telegram. In addition, her music and videos have garnered over 100 million listens and views on various streaming platforms like YouTube, iTunes, Spotify, Radio Javan, Bia2.com, and others.

Discography 

Albums

Singles

Awards and nominations
 2017 – Best Iranian Female Act, daf BAMA Music Awards
 2016 – Best Iranian Female Act, daf BAMA Music Awards (Nominated)
 2009 – Best Middle Eastern Song, The JPF Awards (Nominated)

See also
 Music of Iran

References

External links
 
 Persian Wikipedia page: https://fa.wikipedia.org/wiki/سپیده_افشار
Kodoom.com – Collection of news articles and events relating to Sepideh (mainly in Farsi language): https://iranians.kodoom.com/en/sepideh/
 
2014 Appearance on Farsi1 talk show Chand Shanbeh
Sepideh performing at the 2017 International FeminEast concert: https://www.riksteatern.se/forestallningar/femineast-2017/
Interviewed as part of BBC TV Persian special
2015 Appearance on Farsi1 talk show Chand Shanbeh
Interview with Behzad before going live on stage
One-on-One interview with Tapesh TV

1975 births
Living people
People from Tehran
Singers from Tehran
Iranian pop singers
Iranian rock singers
Iranian women singers
Kurdish-language singers
Persian-language singers
Iranian women pop singers
Iranian singer-songwriters
Iranian people of Georgian descent
21st-century Iranian women singers
Iranian emigrants to the United States